Camp Alger, near Falls Church, Virginia, was established May 18, 1898, for the Spanish–American War effort. It was approved by Secretary of War Russell A. Alger for whom it was named. By August 1898, more than 35,000 troops were stationed at the camp.

Location
Camp Alger was about  miles from Dunn Loring, a station on a branch of the Southern Railway, as above stated, and 7 miles from Washington, D.C., and about 5 miles distant from Fort Myer. The surface of this tract is rolling, partly wooded, with cultivated clearings and with good drainage. The soil is of clay and sand and nearly impervious to water. Immediately after the selection of this camp preparations were made for the reception of troops by the erection of storehouses at Dunn Loring, where the Southern Railway put in extra sidings to accommodate the increased traffic.

Second Army Corps
The Second Army Corps was constituted May 7, and May 16 Maj. Gen. William M. Graham, was assigned to the command, and the troops which were to compose the corps were ordered to this camp. General Graham arrived May 19 and assumed command, which he exercised during the existence of the camp. This corps was composed wholly of volunteers. The troops commenced arriving the 18th of May, and by the last of that month there were 18,309 officers and men in camp. On the last day of June there were 23,511 officers and men, on the last day of July there were 22,180, on the last day of August the troops present at this camp. Total number of troops that went to Camp Alger 31,195.

Duffield's brigade left camp June 15 and Garretson's brigade July 5, both for Santiago, Cuba to reinforce Gen. Shafter's army.

President McKinley

The 8th Ohio Infantry Regiment, U.S. Volunteers, arrived at Camp Alger on May 19, 1898, was nicknamed “McKinley’s Own” or “The President’s Own” because three companies were from President William McKinley's hometown of Canton.

Another unit from McKinley's home state was the Ninth Ohio Volunteer Infantry Battalion, an African American regiment. At Camp Alger, this battalion was initially assigned to the Second Brigade, Second Division, of the Second Army Corps.

When President William McKinley and his Cabinet visited Camp Alger, on May 28, 1898, two short films were made of this event.

Water and sanitation
The water supply was also quite limited and never was sufficient for other uses than cooking and drinking, and not that until about the 25th of June, when about forty wells had been sunk. There were no adequate bathing facilities nearer than the Potomac River, which was 7 miles distant. The troops were encamped both in the open and wooded portions. Those in the latter did not seem to suffer on account of their position. The sinks were generally properly policed, of the regulation depth, and were very soon inclosed.

The woods were quite badly polluted by the excreta of the men; but the commanding officer issued stringent sanitary regulations and used great efforts to see that they were obeyed. His efforts were fairly successful. The troops were well supplied with tentage. The camps of the different regiments were well policed, and the refuse properly disposed of by burning. The rations were abundant in quantity and good in quality. Field bakeries were established in the camp and at Dunn Loring on August 2, from which the corps was supplied with excellent bread. As heretofore stated, on 1 August it was decided to reduce the number of troops, one division being sent to Thoroughfare Gap, and about two weeks later it was decided to move the whole corps. Early in September that was accomplished. During the existence of this camp the weather was exceedingly hot and some portion of the time very rainy, both of which conditions, with myriads of flies which infested the camp, were the causes of much discomfort to the men. The health of this locality is reputed to be as good as any in the section of country about Washington.

Typhoid
A defining event of the war and Camp Alger was the typhoid fever epidemic of July to November 1898.

"The number of deaths from May 18 to October 11 was 71, and at Thoroughfare Gap 34. This death rate is not abnormal, and, judging from it, the locality can not be considered unhealthful. The Seventh Illinois Regiment, which was encamped there during the whole time, lost but one man up to the 14th day of December, a record probably not equaled by any other regiment in the service. The establishment of Camp Alger is justifiable upon the report as to the suitableness of the site, but considering the scarcity of water and the want of facilities for bathing, we are of opinion that it was very undesirable, and was not abandoned too soon."

On August 2 the 2nd Division of the corps marched to Thoroughfare Gap, 30 miles distant, and remained in camp there for about one month.

Early in September the remainder of the corps was transferred to Camp Meade, near Middletown, Pennsylvania.

References

External links
Camp Russell A. Alger, historical marker  near Merrifield in Fairfax County, Virginia.
Camp Alger, historical marker Dunn Loring in Fairfax County, Virginia.
Sgt. William Curtis, 9th Massachusetts, Writes of Life at Camp Alger
Sherman Wyre of the 8th Ohio Volunteer Infantry, Co. H. Writes Home from Camp Alger
The Diary of Private William Karg (1868–1927) 8th Ohio Volunteer Infantry, Company M
Spanish American War Camps 1898-99
SPANISH AMERICAN WAR CAMPS 1898-99 PERIOD Primary Sources
Spanish American War Camps

Spanish–American War
Military installations established in 1898
Military installations closed in 1898
1898 establishments in Virginia
1898 disestablishments in Virginia